Henrik Friis Robberstad (September 6, 1901 – July 27, 1978) was a Norwegian politician for the Conservative Party.

He was born in Herlø.

He was elected to the Norwegian Parliament from Hordaland in 1945, but was not re-elected in 1949. Instead he served the terms 1950–1953 and 1954–1957 as a deputy representative.

Robberstad was a member of Bremnes municipality council from both 1928 to 1937 and from 1947 to 1955, serving as deputy mayor during the term 1931–1934.

References

1901 births
1978 deaths
Conservative Party (Norway) politicians
Members of the Storting
20th-century Norwegian politicians